Sehba Akhtar (30 September 1931 – 19 February 1996) was a poet and a film songwriter in Pakistan.

Early life and career
He was born Akhtar Ali Rehmat to Rehmat Ali Rehmat, a poet and a contemporary of the renowned playwright Agha Hashar Kashmiri, in Jammu, British India. Sehba originally belonged to Amritsar, Punjab, India. He started writing verses in his school days. He finished his high school from Bareilly and later attended the Aligarh Muslim University. Later, before Pakistan's independence in 1947,  he visited Karachi along with Quaid-e-Azam Muhammad Ali Jinnah to attend a public gathering organised by Karachi students. Soon after the independence of Pakistan in 1947, he shifted to Pakistan and also started writing poems and songs for Pakistani movies and the Pakistani public.

Popular poems
He wrote many famous poems and songs for the Pakistani people and also became involved in writing film songs for some Pakistani films.

 "Mein Bhi Pakistan Hoon Tu Bhi Pakistan Hai" Sung by Muhammad Ali Shehki, music by Sohail Rana, a Pakistan Television Corporation production
 "Tanha Thee Aur Hamaishah Say Tanha Hay Zindagi" sung by Mehdi Hassan
 "Chand Ki Seij Pe Taaron Se Saja Ke Sehra" Sung by Runa Laila, music by Deebo Bhattacharya for film Jhuk Gaya Aasman (1970)
 "Mujhe Bhulaane Walay Tujhe Bhi Chaen Na Aaey" Sung by Habib Wali Mohammed (a non-film ghazal song)
 "Wahain Zindagi Kay Hasee'n Khawb Tootay" Sung by Jamal Akbar, Music by Kareem Shahab Uddin.
 "Tera Mera Sathi Hay Lehrata Samandar" Film Samander, sung by Ahmed Rushdi
 "Ae watan maan ki tarah", sung by Mohammad Ifrahim

Death and legacy
In late 1995 he became very ill in London, but insisted on returning to Pakistan to launch his poetry book, Mashal. He later died on 19 February 1996.
In Karachi, Pakistan, there is a 'Sehba Akhtar Road' named after him and a library in Nazimabad No.4, Karachi also carries his name.

Awards 
He received the Pride of Performance award from the President of Pakistan in 1996.

References

External links 

Urdu-language poets from Pakistan
Pakistani songwriters
1931 births
1996 deaths
Writers from Karachi
People from Jammu
20th-century Pakistani poets
Recipients of the Pride of Performance